Jan Erlend Kruse (born 31 August 1968) is a Norwegian former football defender.

Club career
Hailing from Kristiansund, he came through the ranks of talent factory Clausenengen before joining first-tier club Brann in 1987. After two seasons there, he took two seasons in Molde and one in Hamkam. In 1993 he spent several months on free transfer before joining third-tier club Averøykameratene in March. He did however manage to return to the top flight with Vålerenga, where he stayed until the summer of 1997 when he was loaned out to Skeid. He was also loaned out to Clausenengen in the spring of 1998 before venturing to Greek football and Panionios. He made 16 appearances in the 1998–99 Alpha Ethniki, scoring one goal. Requiring surgery on the cartilage in both his heels, he returned to Norway after one season. He made a brief comeback in Clausenengen and spent time training with Strømsgodset IF in June 2000. He later alleged that his time in Greece had been marred by the wide prevalence of match fixing.

International career
Kruse was capped a total of 6 games for Norway at international youth level.

Managerial career
Kruse was a youth coach in Lyn, then Bækkelaget in 2006 before coaching Bækkelaget's senior team in 2007.

References

1968 births
Living people
Norwegian footballers
Sportspeople from Kristiansund
Clausenengen FK players
SK Brann players
Molde FK players
Hamarkameratene players
Vålerenga Fotball players
Panionios F.C. players
Eliteserien players
Norwegian First Division players
Association football defenders
Norwegian expatriate footballers
Expatriate footballers in Greece
Norwegian expatriate sportspeople in Greece
Norway youth international footballers
Norway under-21 international footballers